Christoffel F. Hendrik Wiese (born 10 September 1941) is a South African businessman and former billionaire. His source of wealth is consumer retail.

Early life
Wiese was born and grew up in Upington in the Northern Cape region of South Africa. He studied at Paarl Boys' High School in the Western Cape. Wiese attended Stellenbosch University, from where he received BA and LLB degrees.

Career
After university, Wiese practised law at the Cape Bar for some years before working as a Director at Pepkor, the discount clothing chain that his parents helped to found.

Under his leadership, Shoprite started out as a chain of eight supermarkets in Cape Town that was purchased for 1 million rand (equivalent to $122,000 USD) which grew into a multibillion-dollar business due to various acquisitions and expansion strategies made in the first 30 years of operations. After playing a role in helping Shoprite acquire distributor Senta, Wiese started expanding his business into franchising new locations for Shoprite department stores. He also purchased the struggling OK Bazaars from South African Breweries for one rand in 1997; inserting 157 supermarkets and 146 furniture stores to the company and adding jobs to the area. In 2011, Wiese's Shoprite stores were considered to be the sixth overall favourite brand, with a third-most valued brand in terms of community upliftment in South Africa. In addition to Shoprite, Wiese owns more than 1,200 corporate outlets under various names. Shares of Shoprite rose by 50% on the South African stock market from March 2011 to March 2012, with Wiese making a $1.5 billion profit.

Wiese had a net worth of US$6.8 billion, but as of December 2017 is reported to be worth only $742 million. He is the executive director of South African retail giant Shoprite (JSE: SHP). Wiese has been chairman of Invicta Holdings Limited since 2006. Wiese formerly was the 11th-most successful businessman in his chosen fields of industry (accounting, banking, finance, consumer goods, fashion, and retail) and previously was the 69th-most successful person in South African history.

Wiese owns a 44% share of Pepkor since becoming the chairman there in 1981 and starting out as an executive director for the retail store Pep from 1967 to 1973. Pepkor is a discount store in South Africa that was founded in 1965.

In April 2015, it was reported that Virgin Group and their private equity backers had sold 80% of Virgin Active to the South African investment firm Brait, owned by Wiese. The sale price will be £682 million for an 80% stake, valuing the business at £1.3 billion, including debt, and the transaction should be completed in summer 2015, and the company will continue to operate under the Virgin Active brand.

Wiese was formerly chairman and largest shareholder (about 20% following the sale of his company Pepkor to Steinhoff in 2014) of Steinhoff International, a German-listed furniture conglomerate holding company, and resigned in 2017 in the wake of the Steinhoff accounting scandal. Wiese suffered a huge financial loss when the share price crashed and in March 2019 announced he was making a 4 billion dollar claim against Steinhoff.

Lanzerac Manor & Winery
Wiese bought a South African farm dating back from the 19th century in 1991, and converted it into a five-star hotel, Lanzerac Manor & Winery, with 48 rooms. He later sold the property to a foreign investment firm for an undisclosed sum on 7 March 2012.

Financial controversies
As of August 2012, it was reported that Wiese owed SARS an estimated R2 billion in back taxes.

Wiese faced a legal battle to recover $1 million that he was carrying while boarding a flight from England to Luxembourg in 2009. This amount was confiscated by customs officers as the sum was in hard cash bundled up in rubber bands in his luggage.

Personal life
Wiese is married to Caro, lives in Cape Town and has three children. His son Jacob Wiese works for Pepkor and is expected to take over from him when he retires.

Wiese owns various properties including a private game reserve in the Kalahari Desert and the prestigious wine producer, the Lourensford Estate. The Cape Town Sakekamer awarded with the title of Business Leader of the Year while the South African Council of Shopping Centres awarded him with the prestigious Pioneer of the 20th Century Award.

See also
List of South Africans by net worth

References

1941 births
Alumni of Paarl Boys' High School
Living people
People from Cape Town
South African businesspeople
South African billionaires
Stellenbosch University alumni
Afrikaner people